Mary Fritz (May 8, 1938 – July 9, 2016) was an American politician who served in the Connecticut House of Representatives from the 90th district from 1983 to 1985 and from 1987 to 2016.

She died of cancer on July 9, 2016, in Wallingford, Connecticut at age 78.

References

1938 births
2016 deaths
Democratic Party members of the Connecticut House of Representatives